Mary Jones (born December 12, 1803 as Peter Sewally) was an American transgender prostitute and soldier. According to The Sun, she would wear "a dashing suit of male apparel" in the day, while dressing in feminine attire and wearing a prosthetic vagina at night to solicit sexual services for men and steal their money. She is most well known for being the subject of a trial in 1836 where she was charged with grand larceny for stealing the wallets of men she engaged in sexual acts with. She is considered to be one of the first recorded openly transgender people in New York history.

Arrest 
On June 11, 1836, a white mason worker named Robert Haslem solicited sexual services from Jones. When Haslem returned home, he had realized that his wallet containing 99 dollars was stolen and replaced with an empty wallet belonging to another man. When he found and confronted the owner of the replaced wallet, the man at first denied ownership but eventually admitted that he was pickpocketed by Jones as well. The owner of the wallet claimed he didn't want to report the crime to police out of fear of "exposing himself". Haslem reported the crime to the police the next day. Jones was found by police on midnight of the same day. When a police officer found her, he pretended to be interested in her sexual services as he led her into Greene Street and arrested her. When the officer searched her, he realized that Jones was biologically male. When the officer searched her room, he found several more men's wallets.

Trial 
Jones was tried on June 16, 1836 and appeared in court wearing a wig, white earrings, and a dress. She was subjected to much mockery by the audience of the court for her attire. According to The Sun, a person in the audience grabbed the wig off her head, leading to the court bursting out in laughter. 

When asked why she was dressed in feminine attire, she stated-"I have been in the practice of waiting upon Girls of ill fame and made up their Beds and received the Company at the door and received the money for Rooms and they induced me to dress in Women's Clothes, saying I looked so much better in them and I have always attended parties among the people of my own Colour dressed in this way — and in New Orleans I always dressed in this way —"Jones pled not guilty to the charge of grand larceny. She was sentenced to five years of imprisonment at Sing Sing.

The trial was the focus of much sensational media attention, as media tended to report more on her attire than the crime she committed. A lithograph of Jones was drawn by H. R. Robinson, calling her "The Man-Monster".

Later life and arrests 
On August 9, 1845, the Commercial Advertiser published a report about Jones, referring to her as "Beefsteak Pete", being arrested again. Jones got the nickname "Beefsteak Pete" from the fact that she wore a prosthetic vagina when engaging in sex with men to trick them into thinking she was anatomically female.

On February 15, 1846, the New York Herald reported that Jones, also referring to her as "Beefsteak Pete", had been freed from Blackwells Island after being imprisoned for six months for "playing up his old game [and] sailing along the street in the full rig of a female."

Legacy 
While heavily mocked at the time, Jones has been celebrated by modern historians for her actions in court of sharing her experience as a transgender black person to the prominently white audience of the court. In his book, The Amalgamation Waltz, Tavia Nyong'o stated that Jones "[transformed] shame and stigma not by transcending them or repressing them but by employing them as resources in the production of new modes of meaning and being". The Museum of the City of New York has considered Jones to be "one of the first known gender variant/transgender people in New York history".

Artist Arthur Jafa featured a re-imagining of what Jones would've looked like in a self-portrait photograph titled La Scala in his art showcase, A Series of Utterly Improbable, Yet Extraordinary Renditions.The Brooklyn Museum commissioned filmmaker Tourmaline to create a short film named Salacia focusing on the life of Jones. The short was screened at the museum from May 3 to December 9, 2019. The short is currently screened by the Museum of Modern Art as part of their permanent collection.

Jonathan Ned Katz, in his book Love Stories: Sex Between Men Before Homosexuality, says Jones grew up with little education, was illiterate, and signed statements with an X. According to Katz, contrast and scandal made Sewally/Jones so interesting for the press: during the day Peter Sewally reportedly dressed as a man (except in New Orleans) and at night changed into feminine clothes and the role of Mary (who also went under the names of Miss Ophelia, Miss June, Eliza Smith and Julia Johnson). The Herald and Sun, when Sewally was first accused of theft, stated that Sewally had initially carried out business under the name of Mary Jones without stealing from customers. The antiquated term amalgamation'' was used by the press to indicate that customers of various backgrounds were served, which was not the norm, less than ten years after slavery had been abolished.

References 

1803 births
19th-century American LGBT people
19th-century American people
19th-century American women
American LGBT military personnel
American prostitutes
Female prostitutes
Date of death missing
LGBT African Americans
LGBT people from New York (state)
People from New York City
Transgender prostitutes
Transgender women
Inmates of Sing Sing
Year of death unknown